Mad Season can refer to:

 Mad Season (band)
 Mad Season (Matchbox Twenty album), 2000
 "Mad Season" (song), title song of the album
Mad Season (Twiztid album), 2020